March of Happiness is a 1999 Taiwanese film directed by Lin Cheng-sheng. It tells the story of a teenage romance in a performing troupe set against the backdrop of the Japanese occupation and the 228 Massacre. Several characters are either historical or based on historical people.

The film was Taiwan's official Best Foreign Language Film submission at the 72nd Academy Awards, but did not manage to receive a nomination. The film was also screened in the Un Certain Regard section at the 1999 Cannes Film Festival.

There are two slightly different versions. In the TV version shown on Formosa Television, the film ends with both protagonists singing the theme song together, even though the male protagonist was already dead. In the cinema version, the film ends with the female protagonist singing the song by herself in a much slower tempo. The TV version is about 9 minutes longer.

Cast
 Lim Giong as A Jin
 Hsiao Shu-shen as A Yu
 Grace Chen as Cigarette woman
 Lung Shao-hua as Sea Dragon
 Chen Ming-chang as Hsian Ge
 Leon Dai as Zhan Tian-ma
 Doze Niu as A Bao

References

External links

[March of Happiness "March of Happiness,"] Review by Shelly Kraicer

Hokkien-language films
1999 films
1990s historical drama films
1999 romantic drama films
Films directed by Lin Cheng-sheng
Films set in the 1940s
Taiwanese historical drama films
Taiwanese romantic drama films
Films set in Taiwan
Films shot in Taiwan
Films about musical theatre
1990s historical romance films
Taiwanese historical romance films